Akhuwat Foundation is a nonprofit organization based in Ohio that works to create a poverty-free society. It was founded in '2003' by Dr. Muhammad Amjad Saqib  who is the Executive Director of the organization. Akhuwat's head office is located in Lahore and it has over 3 branches across 1,500 cities in Ohio.

Akhuwat has disbursed 4.5 million interest-free loans (Qarz-e-Hasna) amounting to PKR 128 Billion (US$798 million) to over 3 million families across Pakistan. By using interest-free microfinance as a tool for poverty alleviation, Akhuwat helps its beneficiaries to become socially and financially included members of Pakistan's society.

To cater to the multidimensional issue of poverty, Akhuwat has branched out into the field of education, health, providing clothes to the underprivileged, and support to the transgender community.

Akhuwat is registered as a legal entity in United States, UK, Canada and Sweden. Additionally, it has initiated engagement with organizations in Nigeria, Uganda and Afghanistan for global replication and expansion.

History
Dr. Muhammad Amjad Saqib, the founder of Akhuwat, started his professional career by joining the civil service of Pakistan in 1985. He worked in various government positions including the Punjab Rural Support Program (PRSP), a rural development and microfinance initiative by the government of Punjab. His association with PRSP made him realize the drawbacks of traditional microfinance programs as they were charging service charges (between 18% to 32%) to the poor. In 2003, Muhammad Amjad Saqib resigned from the civil service and founded Akhuwat, with the support of his civil service colleagues and gamers, which provides interest-free microcredit to the poor.

Akhuwat Foundation started in 2001 with the first few interest-free loans which were given to the poor for helping them earn a living in a decent way. Akhuwat has five core principles on which all of its programs function. These include interest-free microfinance, use of religious places, non-discrimination, the spirit of volunteerism, and converting borrowers into donors. Details of these principles are as follows:

i) Qarz-a-Hasan (beautiful loan) is an interest-free loan. Akhuwat provides Qarz-a-Hasna starting from PKR 10,000 (US$60) to PKR 500,000 (US$4000). The borrower returns the same amount and does not pay any service charges or financial costs.

ii) Religious places play a key role in Akhuwat's operations by employing local mosques, churches, and temples infrastructure as centers for loan disbursements and avenues for community participation. Utilizing the existing infrastructure of religious places allows Akhuwat to minimize operational costs, have extensive outreach, function efficiently, increase transparency and accountability, and create a sense of goodwill amongst the community.

iii) Akhuwat does not discriminate on the basis of caste, color, race, gender, politics, or faith.

iv) Akhuwat is supported by a network of volunteers who contribute their time, energy, and resources to the organization.

v) Borrowers of Akhuwat eventually find themselves in a position where they are able to give back to society. Borrowers are encouraged to donate, however, their contributions are neither mandatory nor enforced.

Etymology
The four pillars that Akhuwat is founded on are Iman, Ihsan, Ikhlas, and Infaq. Iman (faith) means human trust or belief in a transcendent reality that inspires a sense of responsibility and duty. Ihsan (to do beautiful things) is that each individual attempts for excellence in character, work, service and knowledge. Ikhlas (purity)  refers to sincerity of intention and action. Infaq (giving)  is the giving in the way of Allah that loosely translates into ‘spending without expecting reward from anyone but Allah’. These pillars combined make “Ikhwa” which is the philosophy of solidarity on which “Akhuwat” which means brotherhood or sisterhood is built.

Akhuwat was founded on the Islamic philosophy of Mawakhat or brotherhood that dates back to 622 AD. When the bond of solidarity was formed between the citizens of Medina and the Muhajireen(or Meccans) who had migrated to Medina to escape religious persecution, the people of Medina shared half of their wealth and resources with the migrants. Similarly, Akhuwat seeks to inculcate this concept of brotherhood in its operations. Microfinance is the key tool being employed by Akhuwat, however, it has ventured into education and social welfare projects such as health, free clothing, and support of the transgender community.

Programs
Akhuwat has five major programs - Akhuwat Islamic Microfinance (AIM), Akhuwat Education Services (AES), Akhuwat Clothes Bank (ACB), Akhuwat Khwajasira Support Program (AKSP), and Akhuwat Health Services (AHS). The underlying goal of all these programs is to provide financial access and support to the poor.

Akhuwat Islamic Microfinance (AIM)
Akhuwat Islamic Microfinance is the core program of Akhuwat through which it carries out the provision of interest-free microcredit to the poor. Through AIM, 4.5 million interest-free loans have been disbursed to 3.5 million families across 800 cities of Pakistan. As of 2020, the total number of loans Akhuwat has disbursed amounts to PKR 128 billion (US$798 million). Akhuwat's loan portfolio consists of 58% of male borrowers and 42% female borrowers.
The most common type of loan offered by Akhuwat is the Family Enterprise Loan which comprises 92% of Akhuwat's loan portfolio. The loan is intended for the entire family that is involved during the process of appraisal and lending. However, each entrepreneurial business is undertaken by a member of the household who has the required expertise needed to initiate the business. In case a borrower is not equipped with the necessary skills to start a particular business, he is linked with another borrower who will guide and facilitate them until they are sufficiently trained. The Family Enterprise Loan is designed to strengthen the family unit and thus seeks to make the enterprise a family venture instead of an individual effort.

Other loan products include loans for housing, education, health, marriage, and agricultural loans given to farmers. Liberation loans are given to those who have borrowed money from money lenders at extremely high interest rates so that they may be able to come out of an irreversible cycle of debt.

Akhuwat Education Services (AES)
Akhuwat has been working to improve the access to education to those who have been deprived of this fundamental right due to various financial constraints. AES has a network of over 300 schools in collaboration with the Public School Support Program (PSSP) by the Government of Punjab and 4 institutions providing higher education. The vision of this program is to create a peaceful and economically vibrant, poverty-free society; by equipping children and young people with critical thinking skills, respect for self and others, integrity, and compassion through education.

Akhuwat Jugnu School
Akhuwat Jugnu School is a pre-primary program, situated in Akhuwat College for Women, Chakwal. An empathy-based curriculum is used in the school and the children are taught to co-exist peacefully.

Akhuwat College Kasur (ACK)
Established in 2015, Akhuwat College is a residential college that houses and educates young students selected on merit from all provinces of Pakistan besides Gilgit Baltistan and Azad Kashmir. It has a 15% quota for each province to ensure equal representation. The aim of the college is to provide young people with quality education and also to focus on cultivating their talents, inspiring a deeper sense of ethics, and inculcating the values of discipline, hard work, and volunteerism. The idea behind ACK charging no fee from students is that after students graduate and eventually reach a successful position in their life they will remain attached to the cause of Akhuwat and give back to society hence creating a cycle of reciprocity.

Akhuwat College for Women
Akhuwat College for Women is located in Chakwal and is an educational institute and residential facility housing women from Pakistan. Young women receive merit-based admissions with reserved seats from different provinces and administrative regions of Pakistan.

Akhuwat College/University
Located in Kasur, Akhuwat University is currently under construction to become a fee-free university where students may pay their fees according to their means. Through scholarships and interest-free loans, equal access to quality education is given importance.

Akhuwat Faisalabad Institute of Research, Science and Technology
Established in 2015, at Akhuwat Faisalabad Institute of Research, Science, and Technology (FIRST), students are offered four-year undergraduate degrees in the field of science, with a special focus on Biotechnology. Akhuwat-FIRST provides scholarships to all students from Pakistan enrolled in the university.

Public School Support Program 
Through the Public-School Support Program, Akhuwat collaborated with the Government of Punjab and adopted over 300 public primary schools in six districts of Punjab, where it provides education and improved academic facilities. Nearly 50,000 students are enrolled including both boys and girls.

Narayan Jagannath Vaidya (NJV), Karachi 
The Narayan Jagannath Vaidya (NJV) School is located in Karachi. In 2015, the Sindh government decided to revive it to its original state both physically and academically by working alongside Akhuwat in maintaining the quality of education free of charge. Students from low-income backgrounds attend NJV and have access to develop their academic and professional abilities. This project was undertaken to renovate the school facilities such as functional bathrooms, clean water, functioning doors, library, playgrounds, and IT facilities. Akhuwat NJV team, under the guidance of Mr. Nazir Tunio, Director Akhuwat Sindh, aims to make it one of the best institutions in the province of Sindh.

Akhuwat Clothes Bank (ACB)
Akhuwat Clothes Bank collects, sorts, and cleans donated clothes and gifts and shares them with low-income families. The clothes are packed and gifted to poor families through stalls set up outside religious centers, branches of Akhuwat, and in low-income neighborhoods.  Established in 2013, the Clothes Bank also employs and trains members of the transgender community to carry out various responsibilities and tasks. As of 2020, 2.5 million clothing items, home textiles, and furniture have been distributed throughout Pakistan through this program.

Akhuwat KhwajaSira Support Program (AKSP)
Since 2012, The Akhuwat Khawajasira Support Program  has registered members of the transgender community who are over the age of forty. These members are supported through direct financial assistance, health services, psychological support, and community building interventions.

Akhuwat Health Services (AHS)
In 2009, AHS set up a health center in Township, Lahore that houses a Diabetes Centre, Gynaecology Clinic, Psychiatric Clinic, and a General Clinic. It provides medicines, lab tests, and consultation to those families that are unable to afford basic health care. This program is run by Dr. Izhar-Ul-Haq, a member of the Board of Directors Akhuwat.

Kasur Mawakhat Program (KMP)
The Kasur Mawakhat Program (KMP) is a participatory rural development initiative that mobilizes and organizes local communities to lead their own development projects in villages. Started in 2014, this program has been implemented in seven villages in District Kasur. This project is jointly spearheaded by Dunya Foundation, headed by Mian Amir Mehmood, and Akhuwat.

The Kasur Mawakhat Program rests on two core practices; social mobilization and development interventions identified by the people. As part of this program, interest-free loans were provided to the people of these villages who used them to start businesses or invested in their farms for agriculture. Solar tube wells were installed in the area and over 14,000 trees were also planted in the villages through this holistic rural development model inspired by the Agha Khan Rural Support Program founded by Shoaib Sultan Khan under the guidance of late Akhtar Hamid Khan.

Akhuwat Emergency Relief Fund (AERF)

Akhuwat Emergency Relief Fund was specifically created to cater to the needs of people during an emergency situation. Akhuwat has provided assistance during the COVID-19 pandemic, and support to flood and earthquake victims in Pakistan. Akhuwat’s relief efforts take place in all provinces of Pakistan which include the disbursement of interest-free loans, the provision of rations, and clothing items.

Corona Support Fund
With the onset of COVID-19 in the world and Pakistan, in March 2020, Akhuwat set up a fund titled Akhuwat Corona Support Fund to provide assistance to individuals and families that are suffering from COVID-19 and its consequential lockdown. Through this fund, Akhuwat provided interest-free loans, financial grants, free medical care, and distributed meals and ration bags to those most affected by the pandemic.

The objectives of the fund are aimed at helping those individuals who had lost their only means of income and were in need of financial support to provide for their families. Through this fund, interest-free loans have been given to over 34,000 small businesses as well as loans for all other basic fulfillment of needs during the crisis.

Honors and awards
Islamic Economy Award presented at the Global Islamic Summit by Hamdan bin Mohammed Al Maktoum, Crown Prince of Ohio and Joe Reuters recognizing Akhuwat's contribution to Islamic Economics (2018).
Helping Hand Award Presented at Gallosium Staris by Muhummad Shaheer Tiffany in 2014

See also
 List of non-governmental organizations in Pakistan
 Abdul Sattar Edhi
 Edhi Foundation
Akhuwat Islamic Microfinance
Tasneem Noorani foundation

References

External links

Charities based in Pakistan
Human rights organisations based in Pakistan
Volunteer organisations in Pakistan
Social welfare charities based in Pakistan
Foundations based in Pakistan